Lucía Figar de Lacalle (born Madrid, 4 February 1975) is a Spanish politician in the People's Party (PP). She was the Minister of Education, Youth and Sports in the Government of the Community of Madrid during the period of 2012 to 2015, when she resigned after being charged in Operación Púnica. She serves as secretary of Communication in the People's Party of the Madrid Community.

She is noted as a representative figure of the so-called Clan de Becerril, a generation of PP cadres tasked with the privatization of public education and health services.

References 

Politicians from Madrid
People's Party (Spain) politicians
1975 births
Living people
Women government ministers of Spain
Government ministers of the Community of Madrid
Members of the 8th Assembly of Madrid
Members of the 9th Assembly of Madrid
Members of the People's Parliamentary Group (Assembly of Madrid)